Genetic Drift is a shoot 'em up video game written by Scott Schram for the Apple II and published by Broderbund in late 1981. An Atari 8-bit family port was released in 1982.

Gameplay
Genetic Drift is a game in which the player changes hostile mutants into friendly life forms.

Reception
Bob Boyd reviewed the game for Computer Gaming World, and stated that "This is not a game for the pondering thoughtful player. I would recommend this game to arcade addicts only. The game can become extremely angering especially when you've got all but one form turned into a TV set and while waiting for it to come back into range you notice the heart peacefully drifting toward you from the rear is upside down."

Development
Scott Schram quit his job to write the game for the Apple II. He spent several weeks developing Photon Base, which Broderbund retitled Genetic Drift.

References

External links
Softalk review
Review in The Addison Wesley Book Of Atari Software 1984

1981 video games
Apple II games
Atari 8-bit family games
Broderbund games
Shoot 'em ups
Video games about evolution
Video games developed in the United States
Video games set in outer space